Ralph A. Ham (March 1849 – February 13, 1905) was a Major League Baseball outfielder in the 19th century.  He played for the Rockford Forest Citys of the National Association in 1871. He is known for committing 13 errors over the course of 19 games, which was most likely due to Rockford's home park, the Agricultural Society Fair Grounds, being unlevel.

References

External links
Baseball Reference

19th-century baseball players
Major League Baseball left fielders
Baseball players from New York (state)
Rockford Forest Citys players
Sportspeople from Troy, New York
1849 births
1905 deaths